23rd CFCA Awards
December 20, 2010

Best Film: 
 The Social Network 

The 23rd Chicago Film Critics Association Awards, honoring the best in film for 2010, were announced on December 20, 2010.

Winners and nominees

Best Actor
Colin Firth – The King's Speech
 Jeff Bridges – True Grit
 Jesse Eisenberg – The Social Network
 James Franco – 127 Hours
 Ryan Gosling – Blue Valentine

Best Actress
Natalie Portman – Black Swan
 Annette Bening – The Kids Are All Right
 Jennifer Lawrence – Winter's Bone
 Lesley Manville – Another Year
 Michelle Williams – Blue Valentine

Best Animated Film
Toy Story 3
 Despicable Me
 How to Train Your Dragon
 The Illusionist
 Tangled

Best Cinematography
Inception – Wally Pfister Black Swan – Matthew Libatique
 Shutter Island – Robert Richardson
 The Social Network – Jeff Cronenweth
 True Grit – Roger Deakins

Best DirectorDavid Fincher – The Social Network
 Darren Aronofsky – Black Swan
 Debra Granik – Winter's Bone
 Tom Hooper – The King's Speech
 Christopher Nolan – Inception

Best Documentary Film
Exit Through the Gift Shop
 Inside Job
 Restrepo
 The Tillman Story
 Waiting for "Superman"

Best Film
The Social Network
 Black Swan
 Inception
 The King's Speech
 Winter's Bone

Best Foreign Language Film
A Prophet, France Biutiful, Mexico
 The Girl with the Dragon Tattoo, Sweden
 I Am Love, Italy
 Mother, South Korea

Best Original ScoreBlack Swan – Clint Mansell I Am Love – John Adams
 Inception – Hans Zimmer
 The Social Network – Trent Reznor and Atticus Ross
 True Grit – Carter Burwell

Best Screenplay – AdaptedThe Social Network – Aaron Sorkin Rabbit Hole – David Lindsay-Abaire
 Toy Story 3 – Michael Arndt
 True Grit – Joel Coen and Ethan Coen
 Winter's Bone – Debra Granik and Anne Rosellini

Best Screenplay – OriginalInception – Christopher Nolan Black Swan – Mark Heyman, Andres Heinz and John McLaughlin
 Four Lions – Chris Morris, Jesse Armstrong, and Sam Bain
 The Kids Are All Right – Lisa Cholodenko and Stuart Blumberg
 The King's Speech – David Seidler

Best Supporting ActorChristian Bale – The Fighter
 Andrew Garfield – The Social Network
 John Hawkes – Winter's Bone
 Mark Ruffalo – The Kids Are All Right
 Geoffrey Rush – The King's Speech

Best Supporting Actress
Hailee Steinfeld – True Grit
 Amy Adams – The Fighter
 Helena Bonham Carter – The King's Speech
 Melissa Leo – The Fighter
 Jacki Weaver – Animal Kingdom

Most Promising Filmmaker
Derek Cianfrance – Blue Valentine
 Banksy – Exit Through the Gift Shop
 David Michôd – Animal Kingdom
 Aaron Schneider – Get Low
 John Wells – The Company Men

Most Promising Performer
Jennifer Lawrence – Winter's Bone
 Armie Hammer – The Social Network
 Katie Jarvis – Fish Tank
 Tahar Rahim – A Prophet
 Hailee Steinfeld – True Grit

References

External links
 chicagofilmcritics.org

 2010
2010 film awards